Jackson River is the name of rivers and places:

Rivers
 Jackson River (New Zealand), New Zealand
 Jackson River (Virginia), United States

Places 
 Clifton Forge, Virginia, once known as Jackson's River Station

See also 
 Jackson (disambiguation)
 Jackson Lake (disambiguation)
 Jackson Rivera, Puerto Rican volleyball player
 Jackson Rivera (boxer), Venezuelan boxer